Ren Wei may refer to:

Ren Wei (racing driver) (born 1983)
Ren Wei (footballer) (born 1997)
Wei Ren, professor and electrical engineer at the University of California, Riverside